The Chollima Statue is a monument on  in Pyongyang, the capital of North Korea. The monument symbolizes the "Chollima speed" of the Chollima Movement. The legendary winged horse Chollima depicted by the monument is said to travel 1,000 ri (400 km) a day.

History
The monument was constructed as a gift to Kim Il-sung. It was built by the Merited Sculpture Production Company of the Mansudae Art Studio. The statue was unveiled on 15 April 1961, the 49th birthday of Kim Il-sung. The impetus to build the monument was Kim Il-sung's speech "Let Us Further Develop Popular Art" given to rural amateur artist groups on 7 March 1961. The Chollima Statue was awarded the People's Prize.

Features
The monument is 46 meters tall in total. The sculpture stands 14 meters high and is 16 meters long. The two figures riding the Chollima, a worker and a woman peasant, are 7 meters and 6.5 meters tall, respectively. The worker raises a document from the Central Committee of the Workers' Party of Korea and the peasant holds a sheaf of rice. The figures are made of bronze, while the base is granite.

See also

Socialist realism
Culture of North Korea
Korean architecture

References

Further reading

Monuments and memorials in North Korea
Buildings and structures in Pyongyang
1961 establishments in North Korea
Cultural infrastructure completed in 1961
Outdoor sculptures in North Korea
Equestrian statues in North Korea
Statues in North Korea
Sculptures of men
Sculptures of women
20th-century architecture in North Korea